Ygos-Saint-Saturnin (Gascon: Igòs e Sent Saturnin) is a commune in the Landes department in Nouvelle-Aquitaine in southwestern France.

Population

History
The comune was created in 1822 at the merger of Ygos and Saint-Saturnin.

See also
Communes of the Landes department

References

Communes of Landes (department)